Sönam Choklang (1439–1504) was a Tibetan Buddhist religious leader. He was from Tsang Province. He was posthumously recognised as the second Panchen Lama.

He founded Wensa Monastery in Tsang, a Gelug hermitage known for the Wensa Nyengyu teachings.

References

Panchen Lama 02
1438 births
1505 deaths
15th-century Tibetan people
16th-century Tibetan people